The 1938 Fresno State Bulldogs football team represented Fresno State Normal School—now known as California State University, Fresno—during the 1938 college football season.

This was the last year Fresno State competed in the Far Western Conference (FWC). They had been a charter member of the conference (founded in 1925). In their 14 years of FWC play, the Bulldogs won or shared the championship four times (1930, 1934, 1935, 1937). Fresno State became a charter member of the California Collegiate Athletic Association (CCAA) in 1939.

The 1938 team was led by third-year head coach James Bradshaw and played home games at Fresno State College Stadium on the campus of Fresno City College in Fresno, California. They finished the season with a record of ten wins and one loss (7–3, 2–1 FWC). The Bulldogs outscored their opponents 224–99 for the season.

Schedule

Notes

References

Fresno State
Fresno State Bulldogs football seasons
Fresno State Bulldogs football